Philip Boehm (born 1958) is an American playwright, theater director and literary translator. Born in Texas, he was educated at Wesleyan University, Washington University in St. Louis, and the State Academy of Theater in Warsaw, Poland.

Boehm is the founder of Upstream Theater in St. Louis, which has become known for its productions of foreign plays. Fluent in English, German and Polish, he has directed plays in Poland and Slovakia. His own written work includes several plays such as Mixtitlan, Soul of a Clone, Alma en venta, The Death of Atahualpa and Return of the Bedbug.

Boehm has translated over thirty novels and plays by German and Polish writers, including Herta Müller, Franz Kafka and Hanna Krall. Nonfiction translations include A Woman in Berlin and Words to Outlive Us: Eyewitness Accounts from the Warsaw Ghetto. For these translations he has received fellowships from the NEA and the John Simon Guggenheim Memorial Foundation, as well as several awards including the Schlegel-Tieck Prize, the Oxford-Weidenfeld Translation Prize, the Helen and Kurt Wolff Translator's Prize, and the Ungar German Translation Award.

Selected translations and adaptations
 Anonymous: A Woman in Berlin: Eight Weeks in the Conquered City: A Diary (Schlegel-Tieck Prize, ATA Ungar Award)
 Ingeborg Bachmann: Malina
 Ulrich Alexander Boschwitz: The Passenger
 Bertolt Brecht: In the Jungle of the City (play)
 Georg Büchner: Woyzeck (adaptation) (play)
 Stefan Chwin: Death in Danzig (Soeurette Diehl Fraser Award)
 Ida Fink: Traces: Stories (co-translator: Francine Prose)
 Aleksander Fredro: Sweet Revenge (play)
 Wilhelm Genazino: The Shoe Tester of Frankfurt
 Michal Grynberg, ed.: Words to Outlive Us: Eyewitness Accounts from the Warsaw Ghetto
 Christoph Hein: Settlement
 Christoph Hein: Willenbrock 
 Christoph Hein: The Tango Player
 Anna Janko:  A Little Annihilation  
 Franz Kafka: Letters to Milena 
 Arthur Koestler: Darkness at Noon (American Translators Association's Ungar German Translation Award)
 Hanna Krall: Chasing the King of Hearts (Found in Translation Award, PEN Los Angeles Award, Soeurette Diehl Fraser Award)
 Lucía Laragione: Cooking with Elisa (play)
 Herta Müller: The Fox Was Ever The Hunter 
 Herta Müller: The Hunger Angel (Oxford-Weidenfeld Translation Prize, National Translation Award, ATA Ungar Award)
 Herta Müller: The Appointment (co-translator: Michael Hulse)
 Albert Ostermaier: Infected (play)
 Minka Pradelski: Here Comes Mrs. Kugelman
 Rafik Schami: Damascus Nights 
 Peter Schneider: Couplings: A Novel 
 Peter Schneider: The German Comedy (co-translator: Leigh Hafrey) 
 Tilman Spengler: Spinal Discord: One Man's Wrenching Tale of Woe in Twenty-Four (Vertebral) Segments 
 Ilija Trojanow: The Lamentations of Zeno
 Ingmar Villqist: Helver's Night (play)
 Gregor von Rezzori: An Ermine in Czernopol (Helen and Kurt Wolff Translator's Prize, PEN USA Award)
 Christine Wunnicke: The Fox and Dr. Shimamura (Helen and Kurt Wolff Translator's Prize)

References

1958 births
German–English translators
People from Texas
American artists
Living people
Wesleyan University alumni
Washington University in St. Louis alumni